Dera Ismail Khan Division is an administrative division of Khyber Pakhtunkhwa Province, Pakistan. It is the southernmost division of Khyber Pakhtunkhwa.

Location 
Dera Ismail Khan Division borders Bannu Division (also Khyber Pakhtunkhwa) in the north, Dera Ghazi Khan Division and Sargodha Division (both Punjab) in the south-east and east respectively, Zhob Division (Balochistan) province in the south, and Afghanistan in the west.

History 
It was formed after the implementation of the One Unit Scheme in 1954, according to which the North-West Frontier Province was divided into Dera Ismail Khan and Peshawar Divisions reforms of 2000 abolished the third tier of government. Until the 1990s, it also contained Bannu Division. After the passing of the 25th Amendment in 2018, the South Waziristan Tribal Agency was added to the division.

Districts 
It currently contains the following districts:

 Dera Ismail Khan District
 Tank District
 Lower South Waziristan District
Upper South Waziristan District

References

Divisions of Khyber Pakhtunkhwa